Jason Jackson (born May 12, 1972) is an American sportscaster and writer. He worked for ESPN from 1995 until 2002 for sending inappropriate messages to a female co-worker. best known as the host of NBA 2Night. Jason is currently the TV Host/Courtside Reporter for the Miami Heat on FOX Sports Florida/Sun Sports and is a talk show co-host/analyst on SiriusXM NBA Radio.

In 2003, he hosted his own sports talk radio show in Hartford, Connecticut, called The Jax Show, and in September 2007, he returned to hosting The Jax Show weekday afternoons on WQAM in Miami. He currently works as a broadcaster for the Miami Heat. From January through October 2012, The Jax Show reappeared in the afternoons from 1-3 PM on the Miami Heat's flagship station WAXY.

Kelly Dwyer of SI.com wrote in his 2006 "NBA Announcers Report Card" that Jason Jackson might be the best side-line reporter in the business.

Jackson graduated from Bowling Green State University in 1994, where he had served as a resident advisor at Bromfield Hall and as President of the Undergraduate Student Government.

References

External links
 Article at ESPN.com

1972 births
Living people
African-American television personalities
American sports radio personalities
American television reporters and correspondents
Bowling Green State University alumni
Miami Heat announcers
National Basketball Association broadcasters
21st-century African-American people
20th-century African-American people